Ferrissia gentilis is a species of small freshwater snail or limpet, an aquatic gastropod mollusc in the family Planorbidae, the ram's horn snails and their allies.

Distribution 
This freshwater limpet is endemic to Brazil,  where it is known from the coastal regions of Goiás, Rio Grande do Sul and Santa Catarina in the south of the country.

Habitat and ecology
F. gentilis occurs in ponds and rivers, where it is found on substrates dominated by organic material and sludge. It commonly associates with the roots of the Water Hyacinth species Eichhornia azurea and E. crassipes.

References

Planorbidae
Gastropods described in 1991